A Burglar for a Night is a 1918 American silent comedy film directed by Ernest C. Warde and starring J. Warren Kerrigan, Lois Wilson and William Elmer.

Cast
 J. Warren Kerrigan as Kirk Marden
 Lois Wilson as Janet Leslie
 William Elmer as William Neal
 Herbert Prior as Wilbur Clayton
 Robert Brower as Daniel Marden
 Charles K. French as James Herrick
 Lydia Yeamans Titus as Maggia, the Maid
 Arma Roma as Ruby Fallon

References

Bibliography
 Rainey, Buck. Sweethearts of the Sage: Biographies and Filmographies of 258 actresses appearing in Western movies. McFarland & Company, 1992.

External links
 

1918 films
1918 comedy films
1910s English-language films
American silent feature films
Silent American comedy films
American black-and-white films
Films directed by Ernest C. Warde
Films distributed by W. W. Hodkinson Corporation
1910s American films